Seventeen Going Under is the second studio album by English musician Sam Fender. The album was released on 8 October 2021 through Polydor Records. The album explores Fender's upbringing and how it has impacted who he is today, exploring both his outward nihilism as well as his internal self-examination. Three singles were released ahead of the album: the title track, "Get You Down" and "Spit of You".

The album received universal acclaim from music critics and was also a commercial success becoming Fender's second number one album in the UK Albums Chart and Scottish albums chart. It also peaked at number 4 in the Irish albums chart. NME named Seventeen Going Under the best album of 2021, topping their year-end list, and was named the best indie rock album of 2021 by PopMatters. The album also received a nomination at the 42nd Brit Awards in the British Album of the Year category and won the awards for Best Album by a UK Artist and Best Album in the World at the 2022 NME Awards. The album was nominated for the 2022 Mercury Prize.

Background 
On 7 July 2021, Fender announced his second album, Seventeen Going Under and released the title track as the lead single. The single focuses on the time Fender was seventeen and struggling to help his mother financially. Alongside this, Fender announced the tracklist of his then-forthcoming album and described it as "a coming of age story. It's about growing up. It's a celebration of life after hardship, and it's a celebration of surviving".

Critical reception 
On review aggregator Metacritic, the album has a score of 83 out of 100 based on nine critics' reviews, indicating "universal acclaim". The Guardian writer Alexis Petridis gave the album five out of five stars and named it his album of the week, calling it "urgent, incisive and brave when it would have been easier for Fender to deck out his festival-ready, TikTok-able melodies with something notably blander and less pointed" and "really powerful". Roisin O'Connor of The Independent felt that Fender had refined both "his songwriting and his sound" from his debut, calling the first six songs "far stronger" lyrically than the rest of the album, and summarised Fender as celebrating surviving the "politicised, polarised and [...] permanent state of anxiety" that the world is in.

Journalist Ewan Gleadow, writing for Spark Sunderland, praised the album, calling it "An intense and passionate showcase of emotions" that provided an "understanding of growing up and out of past behaviours." In Tribune magazine, academic and author Alex Niven wrote, “If there is a better, more painful, more condensed summary of the callousness of British neoliberalism in the times we have all recently lived through, I’m not aware of it."

Year-end lists

Track listing 
All tracks are written by Sam Fender.

Standard edition
 "Seventeen Going Under" – 4:57
 "Getting Started" – 3:09
 "Aye" – 3:06
 "Get You Down" – 4:23
 "Long Way Off" – 3:49
 "Spit of You" – 4:33
 "Last to Make It Home" – 5:21
 "The Leveller" – 4:01
 "Mantra" – 4:16
 "Paradigms" – 3:45
 "The Dying Light" – 3:57

Deluxe edition bonus tracks
 "Better of Me" – 3:48
 "Pretending That You're Dead" – 2:58
 "Angel in Lothian" – 4:11
 "Good Company" (live) – 4:46
 "Poltergeists" – 2:31

Live deluxe edition bonus tracks
 "Howdon Aldi Death Queue" – 1:58
 "The Kitchen" (live) – 3:40
 "Alright" – 4:24
 "Wild Grey Ocean" – 3:54
 "Little Bull of Blithe" – 2:10

Charts

Weekly charts

Year-end charts

Certifications

See also
 List of UK Albums Chart number ones of the 2020s

References

2021 albums
Sam Fender albums
Polydor Records albums